John Dower may refer to:
John Gordon Dower (1900–1947), British civil servant and architect
John W. Dower (born 1938), American historian